Tibitin is a genus of ascidian tunicates in the family Styelidae.

Species within the genus Tibitin include:
 Tibitin halimedae Monniot, 1983 
 Tibitin manu Monniot & Monniot, 1987 
 Tibitin probatus Monniot C. & Monniot F., 1987 
 Tibitin transversalis (Tokioka, 1963)

References

Stolidobranchia
Tunicate genera